Joseph Gerard Roger Plamondon (January 5, 1924 – January 26, 2019) was a Canadian professional ice hockey player who played 74 games in the National Hockey League with the Montreal Canadiens on and off from 1945 to 1951. Born in Sherbrooke, Quebec, he won the Stanley Cup in 1946. Plamondon was the last surviving member of Canadiens 1946 Stanley Cup team.

Pre-NHL
Before playing in Montreal, Plamondon played in Senior Amateur and Minor Professional teams: Valleyfield Braves (QPHL and QSHL) and Pittsburgh Hornets (AHL)

Reaching to NHL
During his time with the Canadiens, Plamondon also played with the Montreal Royals (QSHL) and Cincinnati Mohawks (American Hockey League).

Later career

After his last stint with the Royals, Plamondon did not return to the NHL, playing mostly in the Senior Amateur and Minor League circuit:Matane Red Rocks (LSLHL), Chicoutimi Sagueneens (QHL), Cornwall Chevies and Pembroke Lumber Kings (OHA Sr A).

He last played professional hockey in 1958 but from 1953 to 1967 he was also a head coach and player for a number of minor league teams mainly in Quebec and Ontario:

 1953-54 - Matane Red Rock (LSLHL)
 1954-55 - Trois-Rivieres Reds (QPJHL) - head coach only
 1955-56 - Chicoutimi Sagueneens (QHL)
 1956-57 - Cornwall Chevies (OHA Sr A)
 1966-67 - Sherbrooke Braves (QJAHL) - head coach only

Personal

Plamondon was fired by Sherbrooke in 1967 thus ending his hockey career. He later returned to live in Sherbrooke, where he died in 2019.

References

External links 

1924 births
2019 deaths
Canadian expatriate ice hockey players in the United States
Canadian ice hockey left wingers
Chicoutimi Saguenéens (QSHL) players
Cincinnati Mohawks (AHL) players
French Quebecers
Ice hockey people from Quebec
Montreal Canadiens players
Ontario Hockey Association Senior A League (1890–1979) players
Pittsburgh Hornets players
Sportspeople from Sherbrooke
Stanley Cup champions